Christine Jackob-Marks (born 1943 in Mainz) is a contemporary German painter of subtle abstraction in serial works. Christine Jackob-Marks became known to the general public when, in the mid-1990s, her award-winning design for the Memorial to the Murdered Jews of Europe was not implemented due to the veto by Chancellor Helmut Kohl.

Biography 

At the age of 17, Christine Jackob moved to London and applied to the Royal Academy of Dramatic Art. After the audition, she was narrowly turned down, with the kind hint of her young age to try again next year. But since Jackob was interested in the fine arts as well as acting, she visited the London museums. In the National Gallery, in front of Renoir’s painting Les Parapluies (the umbrellas), she decided to pursue painting and applied to the Académie de la Grande Chaumière in Paris. In the class of the French painter Ives Breyer, the first pictures were made from models.

Christine Jackob then moved to the Berlin University of the Arts and studied fine arts in the painting classes of Professors Hartmann, Jaenisch and Jansen. In the early 1960s, she married the architecture student Volker Theissen and they had two children: Jessica and Felix Theissen. The family moved from Berlin-Moabit to an old villa in Nikolassee. The house, formerly also inhabited by Claus Schenk Graf von Stauffenberg, was often used as an original motif for film sequences about the preparations for the 20 July plot, but initially, the couple rented the upper floor to the [[DAAD's Artists in Residence program. This is how they met artists such as Lawrence Weiner, Franz Gertsch and Roman Opalka. Christine Jackob was fascinated by Gertsch's photorealism, as by the paintings of Markus Lüpertz, from whom her husband bought several works.

At the same time, Jackob dealt with the social challenges in post-war Germany and "how to change society". Painting did not seem to give her a satisfactory answer to such complexes of questions: The change in society had to happen "from below", especially through engaged work with children. In addition to her work in the Berlin design studio, Christine Jackob studied educational science and worked as a therapist for children with behavioral problems and their parents. During this time she also met Marina, a toddler whom she and her second husband, Alan D. Marks, adopted.

Artistic development 

The art scene, to which Gerhard Richter, Otto Piene, Emil Schumacher and Anselm Kiefer belonged, and also the inspiration that Christine Jackob-Marks received from the work of Paul Cézanne and Gustave Courbet, for example, and from the extensive 1982 Zeitgeist exhibition in Martin-Gropius-Bau, motivated Jackob-Marks to express her personal perception of the present with her own works.

The first exhibitions followed starting in 1984, mainly with still lifes, including animals; but there were also tombstone paintings with Hebrew inscriptions: "Their souls remain among us". Since the painter was now married to Alan D. Marks, an American concert pianist with Jewish roots, the artistic examination of the crimes of National Socialism became an increasingly important topic for Jackob-Marks. As part of the discussion about a German Shoah memorial, Christine Jackob-Marks sharpened her reflections artistically and took part in the 1994 competition.

The jury around Walter Jens awarded her the first prize in the artistic competition for the Memorial to the Murdered Jews of Europe together with Hella Rolfes, Hans Scheib and Reinhard Stangl. But voices were raised that rejected the decision, and due to the intervention of the incumbent Chancellor Helmut Kohl, their design was not built. This started a year-long reorientation with discussions on the location of the monument in Berlin, on the groups of victims of the Nazi dictatorship honored with it, and on the importance of memorials in the 20th and 21st century.
In his book Tacheles—In the Struggle for Facts in History and Politics, published in 2020 by Herder Verlag, Michael Wolffsohn describes the central background in the chapter Art as Politics: The Berlin Holocaust Memorial; and  put it: "Winning a competition fairly is ideal. Losing a competition by fair means is perhaps not ideal, but no less honorable."
With this in mind, Christine Jackob-Marks painted new pictures; often to music and often to the Schubert interpretations of her deceased husband: She made drawings with Indian ink and charcoal, in addition there were strong color changes in mixed media of landscapes, of layers of earth: edges of the open-pit coal mines of the Lausitz region, eruptions of volcanoes, the wild sea, to cosmic black holes, to spiral nebulae from distant suns and back again to earthly nature with its creatures.
 describes her works as sliding into abstractions, as landscapes of the soul: as "pictures in which something actually happens, which are not satisfied with depicting what is available more or less exactly. There is something deeply theatrical about her (Christine Jackob-Marks) interpretations of nature. Her forests blaze, flooded with light, as if they were on fire ... "; the former head of the ZDF feature editorial team for literature and art adds: "What makes your horses comparable to your dogs and elephants is the treatment of the eyes. They literally suck in the viewers. It's strange when you look at her monkeys."

Christine Jackob-Marks has been a lecturer at the HdK and at the Thuringian Summer Academy. Her work has been exhibited nationally and internationally since 1988: in Germany at the gallery at Savignyplatz, from 1995 in the Gallery Poll, 1996 on the ZDF in Mainz, several times in the Hamburg gallery Rose, in Bielefeld in the Samuelis Baumgarte gallery, in the gallery in the Körnerpark, Berlin and until 2018 in the DNA Gallery; 2020 also from the Berlin Gallery Kewenig in Palma de Mallorca.

Christine Jackob-Marks lives and works in Berlin and Ibiza.

Exhibitions (selected solo exhibitions) 
 1988 Gallery at Savignyplatz, Berlin
 1988 Center Artistique International, St. Etienne (France)
 1991 Kunstverein Schering, Berlin
 1991 Galerie Rose, Hamburg (with Reinhard Stangl)
 1993 Rose Gallery, Hamburg
 1994 Art & Concept Gallery, Munich
 1995 Eva Poll Gallery, Berlin
 1995 Rose Gallery, Hamburg
 1995 Galerie Mutter Fourage
 1995 Garden-Park-Landscape, Berlin
 1996 Bauscher Gallery, Potsdam Landscape and Visions
 1996 ZDF Mainz
 1996 Samuelis Baumgarte Galerie, Bielefeld: Pictures and drawings
 1998 Galerie Libro Azul, Art Ibiza Fair, Ibiza (Spain)
 1999 Bauscher Gallery, Potsdam Between heaven and earth
 1999 SESA AG in cooperation with Galerie Eva Poll, Berlin
 2000 Galerie Eva Poll, Berlin Erdwandlungen
 2001 Samuelis Baumgarte Gallery, Bielefeld
 2002 Rose Gallery, Hamburg Summer 2002
 2004 Gallery in the media house GIMM, Mainz
 2004 Wall AG headquarters, Berlin Everything in flux
 2005 Art Academy Galerie Döbele, Dresden Structures, rifts and patterns
 2006 Arte plus Arte, Casa Colonial, Ibiza (Spain)
 2008 First Sound Gallery (798 district) (with Dieter Finke), Beijing (China)
 2008 Bauscher Gallery, Potsdam Painting – Drawings
 2009 Galerie Eva Poll, Berlin Animals
 2010 Gallery in the Körnerpark Animals
 2012 Galerie Cornelissen, Wiesbaden Moments
 2012 Gallery in the Körnerpark landscape views
 2014 Gallery in the Körnerpark Let there be light!
 2016 DNA gallery retrospective
 2018 DNA Gallery, Berlin Happy Birthday
 2020 Gallery Kewenig, Palma de Mallorca (Spain) Easy in difficulty

Awards (selected) 
 1995 First prize in the artistic competition Memorial to the Murdered Jews of Europe together with Hella Rolfes, Hans Scheib and Reinhard Stangl

References

External links 
 website
 Gallery Kewenig: In der Schwere leicht Prof. Manfred Eichel in: "Ocula", Mai 2020
  Landschaftsansichten: Galerie im Körnerpark
  in: DNA Galerie
  in: Galerie Poll
  in: Eröffnungsrede von Prof. Manfred Eichel zur Ausstellung "Augenblicke" in Wiesbaden am 23. September 2012
  In: KUNSTFORUM International.
  Galerie Bauscher: Die Schwellenangst vor der Kunst nehmen. In: die Welt, 2002
 Holocaust-Mahnmal: Zehn Jahre Streit – Chronik der Auseinandersetzung um die Gedenkstätte in Berlin. In: Der Tagesspiegel, 7. Juli 2000.

1943 births
Living people
20th-century German painters
20th-century German women artists
21st-century German painters
21st-century German women artists
German women painters
Artists from Mainz